The National Assembly Building of Belize is the home of Belize's two houses of Parliament,  House of Representatives (lower house) and Senate of Belize.

Opened on October 9, 1971, the building is within a complex of government buildings at Melhado Parade on Independence Plaza in Belmopan and mimics Pre-Columbian Mayan and Brutalist architectural designs. The Building is flanked by two three storey buildings that houses offices.

References

Gallery

See also
Other government buildings on Independence Plaza:

 Prime Minister Building, Belmopan
 Belize House

External links

National Assembly of Belize

Buildings and structures in Belmopan
Government buildings completed in 1970